The 1965 Pacific hurricane season officially started May 15, 1965, in the eastern Pacific, and June 1, 1965, in the central Pacific, and lasted until November 30, 1965. These dates conventionally delimit the period of each year when most tropical cyclones form in the northeast Pacific Ocean. A total of ten systems were observed. The most notable storm was Tropical Storm Hazel, which killed six people in Mexico.


Systems

Tropical Storm Victoria 

On June 4, a tropical depression formed 585 miles (945 km) southwest of Acapulco, Mexico Early the next day, the depression system intensified into the first tropical storm of the season and was named Victoria. At that time, the storm was at its peak intensity of 50 mph (85 km/h) which it retained while moving the northwest. Early on June 7, the tropical storm weakened into a tropical depression before dissipating six hours later.  In all, Tropical Storm Victoria stayed at sea.

Tropical Storm Wallie 

Early on the morning of June 17, a tropical depression formed 185 miles (300 km/h) west of Puerto Angel, Mexico. The depression strengthened into Tropical Storm Wallie. Meanwhile, Wallie was at its peak intensity of 50 mph (85 km/h). Wallie headed northwest and degenerated into an area of low pressure just off the Mexican coast early on June 18. The remnant low made landfall in the near Zihuatanejo, Mexico early on June 18. The low dissipated later that day.

Damage in Mexico from Wallie was described as the worst in eight years. Monetary damages were described was being in the "thousands", however an exact damage total is unknown. No deaths were reported due to the storm.

Tropical Storm Ava 

Early on June 29, a tropical storm was identified 535 miles (860 km) south of Cabo San Lucas, Mexico and named Ava. At that time, the storm was at peak intensity of 50 mph (85 km/h). However, Tropical Storm Ava weakened into a tropical depression within 24 hours. Late on June 30, the depression re-strengthened into a tropical storm and regained peak intensity. At this time, the storm took a track that went north and back south gently. On July 3, Tropical Storm Ava weakened into a tropical depression. Ava dissipated early on July 5. The tropical storm stayed at sea, and no damage was reported.

Tropical Storm Bernice 

On June 30, Tropical Storm Bernice formed. At this time, the system was located 275 miles (445 km) south of Puerto Angel, Mexico. For the next few days, the storm moved northeastward, while maintaining peak intensity of 50 mph (85 km/h). On July 5, Bernice stopped its northeastward motion and began to turn east, Berice dissipating on July 8, without ever impacting any land masses.

Tropical Storm Claudia 

During the afternoon of August 7, a tropical depression formed 150 miles southwest of Cabo San Lucas, Mexico. On August 8, the cyclone strengthened into Tropical Storm Claudia. At that time, Claudia was reaching its peak intensity of 50 mph (85 km/h), while also beginning to recurve to the north. The storm remained at peak intensity while re-curving until August 10 when the wind speeds decreased slightly and advisories were discontinued.  The storm never affected land.

Tropical Storm Doreen 

Late on August 19, Tropical Storm Doreen was first located with a TIROS satellite image. The next day, a ship, the San Juan Prospector reported winds of 40 knots (45 mph, 70 km/h) and a pressure of 975 mbar (hPa). At this time, Doreen was moving to the northwest as 10 knots. On August 21, Doreen altered its course to the west, but reversed back to its original heading the next day. On August 22, the ship Kyoyu Maru, which was just north of the storm's center reported winds of 60 knots (70 mph, 115 km/h). Over the next few days, the storm gently recurved northward but then slowed down and headed to the southwest. On August 30, Tropical Storm Doreen crossed the Central Pacific where it dissipated the next morning. During the course of the system, 13 ships reported winds related to Doreen,  but no damage was reported.

Hurricane Emily 

On August 30, a moderate tropical storm developed. It slowing intensified, becoming the first hurricane of this season at 1200 UTC August 31. Emily began to weaken while moving northward in the Eastern Pacific. On 0000 UTC time September 3, Emily weakened into a tropical depression. It hit Baja California at the same intensity on September 6.  According to one source, Emily was the first potentially hazardous storm in many years to approach Southern California. It approached Southern California while the SEALAB II Project was underway at La Jolla, California. There was concern that waves from Emily would move the Berkone, a support ship for SEALAB, away from the SEALAB site as the project would have to be halted. Rainfall totals reach 1 in (25 mm) in isolated areas.

Tropical Storm Florence 

Tropical Storm Florence first formed on September 8 as a tropical depression. After 24 hours, Florence intensified into a tropical storm. At that time, the cyclone peaked with 50 mph (80 km/h) winds. However, on September 11, Florence suddenly weakened. After maintaining its intensity for a while, the depression was declared dissipated.  Florence stayed at sea and no deaths or damage were reported.

Tropical Storm Glenda 

Tropical Storm Glenda formed on September 13 and maintained the same intensity of 50 mph(85 km/h) for nine days before advisories were dropped.

Tropical Storm Hazel 

Hazel developed from a northward-moving disturbance that originated southeast of Socorro Island. After reaching tropical storm strength on the Saffir–Simpson hurricane scale, the cyclone turned to the east-northeast – a motion confirmed by a ship report. The storm made landfall near Mazatlán on September 26 and quickly became extratropical.  Thousands more were left homeless. Mazatlán's shrimp fleet, which makes up the base of the city's economy, suffered major damage, while in southern Sinaloa, 55,000 acres of cotton, corn, and sorghum were lost. At least 50 boats were damaged or sunk by the storm. The damage from the storm was estimated at $10 million (1965 USD) and possibly more, making Hazel the costliest tropical cyclone of the season.

Accumulated cyclone energy (ACE) rating 

Accumulated cyclone energy (ACE) is a measure of the activity of a hurricane season. It is calculated by squaring the windspeed of a cyclone with at least tropical storm-force winds every six hours, summing the results, and dividing that total by 104. As a tropical cyclone does not have gale-force winds until it becomes a tropical storm, tropical depressions are not included in these tables. For all storms, ACE is given to three significant figures. The ACE in the east Pacific proper (140°W to North America) is given; the ACE in the central Pacific (the International Date Line to 140°W) is given in brackets.

Storm names 
The following names were used for named storms that formed in the eastern Pacific in 1965. This is a part of list 2, which was used from 1960 to 1965. Names that were not assigned are marked in gray. The name Hazel was retired and replaced with Heather in 1969.

See also 

 Pacific hurricane season
 1965 Atlantic hurricane season
 1965 Pacific typhoon season
 Australian region cyclone seasons: 1964–65 1965–66
 South Pacific cyclone seasons: 1964–65 1965–66
 South-West Indian Ocean cyclone seasons: 1964–65 1965–66

References 

 
Pacific hurricane seasons
Articles which contain graphical timelines